(also romanized Retu in the Kunrei-shiki system) is a Japanese word meaning "violent".

Retsu is also the name of the following fictional characters:
 Retsu Unohana, a character from the manga and anime Bleach
 Retsu, a character from the game Street Fighter
 Retsu, the final boss from the game Final Fight 2
 Retsu Seiba, one of the main characters of Bakusō Kyōdai Let's & Go!!
 Retsu Fukami, main character from the 2007 Japanese tokusatsu television series, Juken Sentai Gekiranger.
 Retsu Kaioh, one of the main characters of Baki the Grappler

Japanese unisex given names